In enzymology, a polypeptide N-acetylgalactosaminyltransferase is an enzyme that catalyzes the chemical reaction

UDP-N-acetyl-D-galactosamine + polypeptide  UDP + N-acetyl-D-galactosaminyl-polypeptide

Thus, the two substrates of this enzyme are UDP-N-acetyl-D-galactosamine and polypeptide, whereas its two products are UDP and N-acetyl-D-galactosaminyl-polypeptide.

This enzyme belongs to the family of glycosyltransferases, specifically the hexosyltransferases.  This enzyme participates in o-glycan biosynthesis and glycan structures - biosynthesis 1.  It has 2 cofactors: manganese,  and calcium.

Nomenclature 

The systematic name of this enzyme class is UDP-N-acetyl-D-galactosamine:polypeptide N-acetylgalactosaminyl-transferase. Other names in common use include:

 protein-UDP acetylgalactosaminyltransferase, 
 UDP-GalNAc:polypeptide N-acetylgalactosaminyl transferase, 
 UDP-N-acetylgalactosamine:kappa-casein polypeptide, 
 N-acetylgalactosaminyltransferase, 
 uridine diphosphoacetylgalactosamine-glycoprotein, 
 acetylgalactosaminyltransferase, 
 glycoprotein acetylgalactosaminyltransferase, 
 polypeptide-N-acetylgalactosamine transferase, 
 UDP-acetylgalactosamine-glycoprotein, 
 acetylgalactosaminyltransferase, 
 UDP-acetylgalactosamine:peptide-N-galactosaminyltransferase, 
 UDP-GalNAc:polypeptide N-acetylgalactosaminyltransferase, 
 UDP-N-acetyl-alpha-D-galactosamine:polypeptide, 
 N-acetylgalactosaminyltransferase, 
 UDP-N-acetylgalactosamine-glycoprotein, 
 N-acetylgalactosaminyltransferase, 
 UDP-N-acetylgalactosamine-protein N-acetylgalactosaminyltransferase, 
 UDP-N-acetylgalactosamine:polypeptide, 
 N-acetylgalactosaminyltransferase, and
 UDP-N-acetylgalactosamine:protein N-acetylgalactosaminyl transferase.

References

 
 

EC 2.4.1
Manganese enzymes
Calcium enzymes
Enzymes of known structure